Narrows Branch is a  long 2nd order tributary to the Uwharrie River in Randolph County, North Carolina.

Course
Narrows Branch rises on the divide of an unnamed tributary to the Uwharrie River about 3 miles northwest of Eleazar, North Carolina.  Narrows Branch then flows southeast to join the Uwharrie River about 1 mile west of Eleazar.

Watershed
Narrows Branch drains  of area, receives about 47.3 in/year of precipitation, has a wetness index of 360.10 and is about 53% forested.

See also
List of rivers of North Carolina

References

Rivers of North Carolina
Rivers of Randolph County, North Carolina